Daniel M. Neumark (born 1955) is an American chemist focusing in physical chemistry and molecular structure and dynamics.  He specializes in the use of ultra-high vacuum techniques (including molecular beams) and photochemistry to characterize the quantum states of elusive or short-lived chemical entities in the gas phase.

Neumark obtained his B.A. and M.A. from Harvard University and went on to earn his Ph.D. in Physical Chemistry from University of California, Berkeley in the lab of future Nobel laureate Yuan T. Lee. From 1984 to 1986 he was a postdoctoral fellow at University of Colorado. He currently is a professor at University of California, Berkeley. He was the Director of the Chemical Sciences Division at Lawrence Berkeley National Laboratory from 2000 to 2010.

Neumark won the William F. Meggers Award in 2005, the Irving Langmuir Award in 2008, the Herbert P. Broida Prize in 2013, and the Bourke Award in 2018. He is an Elected Fellow of the American Association for the Advancement of Science, American Academy of Arts and Sciences and American Physical Society.

References

Fellows of the American Association for the Advancement of Science
Fellows of the American Physical Society
Members of the United States National Academy of Sciences
University of California, Berkeley faculty
University of California, Berkeley alumni
21st-century American chemists
1955 births
Harvard University alumni
Living people